Kureh Ajarazargun (also Romanized as Kūreh Ājarāẕargūn) is a village in Yunesi Rural District, Yunesi District, Bajestan County, Razavi Khorasan Province, Iran. At the 2006 census, its population was 14, in 9 families.

References 

Populated places in Bajestan County